The 1845 Massachusetts gubernatorial election was held on November 10, 1845.

Incumbent Whig Governor George N. Briggs defeated Democratic nominee Isaac Davis, Liberty Party nominee Samuel E. Sewall and Know Nothing nominee Henry Shaw.

Since no candidate received a majority in the popular vote, Briggs was elected by the Massachusetts General Court per the state constitution.

General election

Candidates
George N. Briggs, Whig, incumbent Governor
Isaac Davis, Democrat, member of the Massachusetts Senate
Frederick Robinson, Independent Democrat, former President of the Massachusetts Senate
Samuel E. Sewall, Liberty Party, lawyer, candidate for Governor in 1842, 1843, 1844
Henry Shaw, Native American Party, former U.S. Representative

Results

Legislative election
As no candidate received a majority of the vote, the Massachusetts General Court was required to decide the election. Under Article III of the Constitution of Massachusetts, the House of Representatives chose two candidates from the top four vote-getters, the Senate electing the Governor from the House's choice.

The House sent the names of Briggs and Davis to the Senate on January 10.

The legislative election was held on January 12, 1846.

References

1845
Massachusetts
Gubernatorial